Oligodon calamarius, commonly known as the reed-like kukri or Templeton's kukri snake, is a species of nonvenomous colubrid endemic to Sri Lanka. It is known as කබර දත්-කැටියා  (kabara dath ketiya) in Sinhala.

Etymology
Oligodon templetoni, now a junior synonym of Oligodon calamarius, was named in honour of Irish naturalist Dr. Robert Templeton who obtained the first known specimen.

Description
The head is short, scarcely distinct from the neck. The pupil of the eye is round. The dorsum is light brown with a light vertebral stripe. There are 18–24 narrow dark brown, light-edged cross-bands that are either complete or half-way cross the back. The venter is cream, with square black markings. The forehead has a dark crescentric marking and an elongated spot behind it.

Distribution
O. calamarius is known from Udugama in the Southern Province, Hewissa and Mathugama in the Western Province, Ratnapura and Balangoda in the Sabaragamuwa Province, and Peradeniya in Central Province.

References

Further reading
Boulenger, George A. (1890). The Fauna of British India, Including Ceylon and Burma. Reptilia and Batrachia. London: Secretary of State for India in Council. (Taylor & Francis, printers). xviii + 541 pp. ("Oligodon templetonii ", p. 320).
Boulenger GA (1894). Catalogue of the Snakes in the British Museum (Natural History). Volume II. , Containing the Conclusion of the Colubridæ Aglyphæ. London: Trustees of the British Museum (Natural History). (Taylor and Francis, printers). xi + 382 pp. + Plates I-XX. (Oligodon templetonii, pp. 241–242, 359).
Günther, Albert (1862). "On new Species of Snakes in the Collection of the British Museum". Ann. Mag. Nat. Hist., Third Series 9: 52–67. ("Oligodon Templetonii ", new species, p. 57).
Linnaeus C (1758). Systema naturæ per regna tria naturæ, secundum classes, ordines, genera, species, cum characteribus, differentiis, synonymis, locis. Tomus I. Editio Decima, Reformata. Stockholm: L. Salvius. 824 pp. (Coluber calamarius, new species, p. 216). (in Latin).
Smith MA (1943). The Fauna of British India, Ceylon and Burma, Including the Whole of the Indo-Chinese Sub-region. Reptilia and Amphibia. Vol. III.—Serpentes. London: Secretary of State for India. (Taylor and Francis, printers). xii + 583 pp. (Oligosoma calamarius, pp. 228–229, Figure 78).
Wall, Frank (1921). Ophidia Taprobanica or the Snakes of Ceylon. Colombo, Ceylon [Sri Lanka]: Colombo Museum.  (H.R. Cottle, Government Printer). xxii + 581 pp. ("Oligodon templetoni ", pp. 245–247).

External links
 http://www.wildreach.com/reptile/Serpentes/Oligodon%20calamarius.php 
 https://www.uniprot.org/taxonomy/1297016

calamarius
Snakes of Asia
Reptiles of Sri Lanka
Endemic fauna of Sri Lanka
Reptiles described in 1758
Taxa named by Carl Linnaeus